"Flower" is a song recorded by South Korean girl group GFriend. It was released by King Records on March 12, 2019, as their fourth Japanese single. It was later included in their debut Japanese studio album Fallin' Light (2019).

Release 
It was released as a digital EP on March 12, 2019. A day later, it was released in three physical editions: CD, CD+DVD Type A and CD+Photobook Type B.

Promotion 
GFriend performed the song for the first time at their concert in Zepp Osaka Bayside, as part of their GFriend Spring Tour 2019 Bloom. It was also revealed that the song was chosen as the opening theme for the TV program music-ru TV for the month of March.

Music video 
The music video was released on March 4, 2019. In the video, the group are dressed as bullfighters and perform a dance inspired by tango.

Commercial performance 
"Flower" debuted and peaked at number 9 on the Oricon Singles Chart for the week ending March 25, 2019. The song also picked at number 35 on Billboard's Japan Hot 100.

Track listing

Charts

References 

King Records (Japan) singles
2019 singles
GFriend songs
2019 songs
Hybe Corporation singles
Song articles with missing songwriters